Manuel Garcia may refer to:

Arts and entertainment
Manuel García (tenor) (1775–1832), Spanish singer and composer, father of Manuel Patricio Rodríguez García
Manuel García (baritone) (1805–1906), Spanish singer & voice pedagogue; son of Manuel García (tenor)
Manuel García Ferré (1929–2013), Spanish comic book artist
Manuel García (singer-songwriter) (born 1970), Chilean singer-songwriter
Manolo García (make-up artist) (aka Manuel García), Spanish make-up artist

Military
Garcí Manuel de Carbajal (died 1552), Spanish lieutenant
Manuel García Banqueda (1803–1872), Chilean Minister of War and Navy
Manuel García de la Huerta, Chilean Minister of War and Navy
Manuel Rebollo García (born 1945), Spanish Navy admiral

Politics and law
Manuel José García (1784–1848), Argentine politician, lawyer, economist and diplomat
Manuel García (governor), Spanish governor of Melilla
Manuel García Prieto, Marquis of Alhucemas (1859–1938), Spanish prime minister
Manuel García Pelayo (1909–1991), Spanish jurist

Sports

Association football
Manuel Pablo García (born 1980), Argentinian footballer
Manuel García (footballer, born 1985), Chilean footballer
Manuel García (footballer, born 8 July 1988), Argentine footballer
Manuel García (footballer, born 31 July 1988), Mexican footballer
Manu García (footballer, born 1998), Spanish footballer

Other sports
Cocaína García (Manuel García Carranza, 1905–1995), Cuban baseball player
Manuel García (boxer) (born 1935), Spanish Olympic boxer
Manuel García (biathlete) (born 1955), Spanish Olympic biathlete
Manuel García (cyclist) (born 1964), cyclist from Guam

Others
Manuel Pereiras García (born 1950), Cuban author and translator
Manuel Garcia-Duran, Spanish businessman

Other uses
Manuel Garcia, Texas, a census-designated place in Starr County, Texas, United States

Garcia, Manuel